Lytorhynchus diadema, the crowned leafnose snake or diademed sand snake, is a non-venomous snake found in Middle East, North Africa & West Asia.

Description 
Lytorhynchus diadema adults range from 30-51 cm in length. 

Pale buff or cream color above, with a series of 13 – 18 large transversely rhomboidal dark spots; a dark median band along the head and nape, sometimes confluent with an interocular transverse band; an oblique dark band from the eye to the angle of the mouth; lower parts uniform white.

Distribution 
Algeria, Egypt, Iran, Iraq, Israel, Jordan, Kuwait, Libya, Morocco, Niger, Oman, Saudi Arabia, Tunisia, United Arab Emirates, Yemen, Mauritania, West Sahara.

This species is found in sandy desert, semi-desert, sandy coastal areas, areas of high grassland plateaus (especially those close to rocky areas), and clay plateaus with rocks. This species digs, but is not considered fossorial In Arabia it appears to  occur in a wide range of dry habitats.

Diet 
It feeds mainly on lizards but will eat large arthropods, insects and young rodents.

Reproduction 
The species is oviparous, laying clutches of three to five eggs.

References 

Colubrids
Reptiles of the Middle East
Snakes of Africa
Endemic fauna of Saudi Arabia
Reptiles of North Africa
Reptiles of Iran
Reptiles of Iraq
Reptiles of Jordan